Merulempista turturella is a species of snout moth. It is found in Spain, France, Italy, the Canary Islands and North Africa, including Algeria.

The wingspan is 12–16 mm.

The larvae feed on Tamarix canariensis.

References

Moths described in 1848
Phycitini
Moths of Europe